The Beaumont Enterprise is a newspaper of Hearst Communications, headquartered in Beaumont, Texas. It has been in operation since 1880.

In addition to BeaumontEnterprise.com and the daily newspaper, The Enterprise produces several weeklies—the Jasper Newsboy, the Hardin County News, the Mid County Chronicle, the Orange County News, the Beaumont Journal and the Spanish-language Fronteras, as well as a bi-weekly real estate magazine and two monthly magazines, VIP and Lakecaster.

The Enterprise is a perennial winner of the state’s top journalism awards, including the Texas Press Association’s and Texas Associated Press Managing Editors’ prizes for overall excellence.

Prices
Enterprise prices are: daily, $2; Sunday/Thanksgiving Day, $3. May be higher outside Jefferson & adjacent counties/states.

History
John W. Leonard founded the initial Enterprise as a weekly newspaper in 1880. It became a daily under editor W.W. McLeod in 1896 or 1897, to compete with crosstown rival Beaumont Journal (founded 1889).

In 1907, William P. Hobby became manager and part owner of the Enterprise  and bought the paper outright in 1920, while Governor of Texas. One of his co-owners was general manager/associate publisher James Mapes. According to the Texas State Historical Association, the Enterprise "attained national stature"  under Mapes' leadership — He came to the newspaper in 1908 and rose to ownership by 1931.

In 1918, Waco-based newspapermen Charles E. Marsh and E.S. Fentress purchased the crosstown competitor Beaumont Journal. Buying two other nearby papers (the weekly Port Arthur News and the daily Orange Leader), the pair boosted the Journal circulation and eventually Hobby bought the Journal.

Operating separately under the same company for many years, the Enterprise and Journal merged in 1983. The Hearst Corporation acquired the Enterprise from the Jefferson-Pilot insurance company's publications arm in 1984.

References

External links

 Official Site
 Hearst subsidiary profile of The Beaumont Enterprise

Daily newspapers published in Texas
Hearst Communications publications
Jefferson County, Texas
Newspapers established in 1880